Hulta is a settlement in Blekinge County, Sweden.

References
 

Populated places in Ronneby Municipality